Lough Ree Power Station was a large peat-fired power station in Lanesborough, in Ireland. The power station was constructed as a replacement to the ageing  Lanesborough power station. The plant closed on 18 December 2020.

See also 

 List of largest power stations in the world
 List of power stations in the Republic of Ireland

References 

Peat-fired power stations in the Republic of Ireland